Siam Yapp (born 27 May 2004) is a Thai-English footballer who plays as a forward or a winger for Bangkok.

Career

Club career

As a youth player, Yapp joined the British International School, Phuket in Thailand. Before the 2022 season, he signed for Thai top flight side Police (Thailand). On 9 April 2022, he debuted for Police (Thailand) during a 1–4 loss to Bangkok United. FC Bayern Munchen U19 World Squad 2022.

International career

Yapp is eligible to represent England internationally.

In 2019, Yapp represented 2019 Thailand U15 in the AFF U-15 Championship playing 2 games in the tournament.

References

External links

2004 births
Association football forwards
Living people
Siam Yapp
Siam Yapp
Siam Yapp
Siam Yapp
Siam Yapp
Siam Yapp